Michelle Carney (born 30 December 1981) is an Australian association football player who last played for Australian W-League team Western Sydney Wanderers.

Carney signed with Western Sydney Wanderers following a three-season hiatus. She left Western Sydney Wanderers ahead of the 2016–17 W-League season.

She is the older sister of Socceroo player David Carney.

Honours
With Sydney FC:
  W-League Premiership: 2009
  W-League Championship: 2009

References 

Australian women's soccer players
Living people
Sydney FC (A-League Women) players
Western Sydney Wanderers FC (A-League Women) players
1981 births
Women's association football forwards